Kendriya Vidyalaya Tehran ("Central School Tehran";) is an Indian co-educational international school in the Baharestan District, Tehran, Iran.  Affiliated with the Embassy of India, it serves grade levels LKG (3 years and up) through XII (16 years).
The school, one of several Kendriya Vidyalaya institutions, has roughly 350 students ranging from three years old to 16 with each class size being approximately 15-20 students. The school's primary taught languages are English, Hindi, Punjabi and French. Persian is also taught as a means of communications for the students.

The local school hosts children from several countries including the India, Malaysia, United Kingdom, Romania, Thailand, Pakistan, and Bangladesh to name a few. Several British children moved to the school when the British Embassy School closed its doors in 2011, after the raiding of the British Embassy Tehran due to the proximity to the British Embassy compound on Ferdowsi Street.

History 

The original Indian school has been in Iran since the 1930s, with Punjab School Education Board and Panjab University affiliation, located in Zahedan and serving Sikh families there.

It moved to its present location in central Tehran in 1952, as Indians had moved to that city. At some point its affiliation shifted to the Central Board of Secondary Education (CBSE). The after-effects of the Iranian Revolution of 1979 reduced the school's enrollment as only 60 to 65 Indian families remained in Iran. It became a Kendriya Vidyalaya in 2004.

In a four-year period from 2008 to 2012 it had three grants, which kept the school in operation during a 2009-2010 financial crisis. The first was 81 lakh (81,00,000) rupees from the Ministry of External Affairs of India, the second was 2 crore (2,00,00,000) rupees from Meira Kumar, and the third grant was 2 lakh (2,00,000) rupees sent on August 29, 2012.

The school was visited by Indian Prime Minister Narendra Modi in 2015, who agreed to offer funds from the New Delhi government to fund the school.

Student body
In 2012 the school had 189 students, with 138 being Indians and the remainder from other nationalities including British, Thai, Pakistani and Iranian.

See also
 India–Iran relations

References

External links

 Kendriya Vidyalaya Tehran
 
 Indian Study Channel

India–Iran relations
International schools in Tehran
Indian international schools in Asia
High schools in Iran
Kendriya Vidyalayas
Educational institutions established in 1952
1952 establishments in Iran